The 1985 Samoa National League, or also known as the Upolo First Division, was the 7th edition of the Samoa National League, the top league of the Football Federation Samoa. Kiwi F.C. won their second title, eventually becoming the second in a three title streak.

Standings

References

Samoa National League seasons
Samoa
football